"Make You Mine" is a song recorded by Canadian country music group High Valley for their fourth studio album, County Line (2014). It was written by group member Brad Rempel along with Ben Stennis and the record's producer, Seth Mosley, and features Ricky Skaggs. "Make You Mine" was first released in Canada in December 2014 through Open Road Recordings as the third single off County Line. After High Valley signed to Atlantic Records / Warner Music Nashville in 2015, they re-released the single through that label on February 26, 2016. The song serves as the lead single for their debut major-label album, Dear Life (2016).

The song has been the group's most commercially successful, reaching a career-high peak of 58 on the Canadian Hot 100 in addition to becoming a top 5 hit on the Canada Country airplay chart and being certified Gold by Music Canada. It is the group's second entry on the Billboard Country Airplay chart, and is their first on Hot Country Songs.

Critical reception
"Make You Mine" was selected as a critic's pick by Taste of Country and given a positive review by Billy Dukes. "One could argue the picture this duo paints is too familiar," writes Dukes, "But their arrangement makes this an urgent listen. It's fun that touches your soul, and that is very rare on country radio."

Commercial performance
"Make You Mine" was the second most-downloaded song in Canada and the "most active indie", being the independent single with the most combined sales and streaming, for the week of December 8–15, 2014 according to DMDS. The song debuted and peaked at number 39 on the Billboard Hot Canadian Digital Songs chart dated March 21, 2015. It debuted at number 94 on the Billboard Canadian Hot 100 on the chart dated February 7, 2015 and reached its peak position of 58 in its seventh week on the chart dated March 21, 2015. "Make You Mine" spent 22 weeks on the Canada Country airplay chart and reached a peak position of 5. Music Canada certified the single Gold in April 2016 and Platinum in June 2019.

In the United States, "Make You Mine" debuted at number 59 on the Billboard Country Airplay chart dated March 5, 2016. It entered the top 40 of the chart in its ninth week and has since peaked at number 21 on the chart dated December 3, 2016. "Make You Mine" debuted at number 49 on the Hot Country Songs chart dated July 16, 2016 - their first entry on the chart. It has reached a peak position of 21 on that chart. As of March 2017, the song has sold 237,000 copies in the US. "Make You Mine" debuted at number 8 on the Bubbling Under Hot 100 Singles chart dated January 14, 2017. "Make You Mine" was certified Gold by the Recording Industry Association of America on June 28, 2018.

Music video
The accompanying music video for "Make You Mine" was directed by Kristin Barlowe and premiered January 29, 2015 through CMT Canada.

Track listing
Digital download – single
 "Make You Mine" – 3:31

Charts

Weekly charts

Year-end charts

Certifications and sales

Release history

Notes

References

2014 songs
2014 singles
2016 singles
High Valley songs
Open Road Recordings singles
Warner Music Group singles
Songs written by Seth Mosley
Ricky Skaggs songs
Songs written by Brad Rempel
Songs written by Ben Stennis
Vocal collaborations